James Maitland Hog of Newliston and Kellie FRSE DL (7 August 1799 – 1 August 1858) was a Scottish advocate and landowner. He owned Newliston House and its estates, an impressive mansion by Robert Adam.

Early life
James  Maitland  Hog,  of  Newliston  and  Kellie,  was  born  on  7 August  1799. He was the son of Thomas Hog of Newliston (1742–1827) and his second wife, Mary Stuart (following the death of Lady Penelope-Madan Maitland). He was baptised at Kirkliston Parish Church on 25 August.

He appears to have inherited Kellie Castle in Fife in 1829 but made little use of the property, which was largely left to fall into disrepair. The Castle later became the home of Prof James Lorimer and his sons Robert Lorimer and John Henry Lorimer.

Inheritance and the ten years conflict
He  resided  for  some  time  on a small  estate  called  Muirestone,  near  Edinburgh;  but  in  1834,  on  the  death  of  his  brother,  whom  he  succeeded,  removed  to  Newliston. Mr  Hog  was  decidedly  pious;  his  tastes  even  when  a  boy  were  religious. Evangelical Christianity  was  then  rising  in  influence  among  the  people,  and  progressing  in  the  councils  of  the  church. One  sign  of  the  times  was  the  sending  of Alexander Duff  as  the  first  Missionary  of  the  Scottish  Church  to  India. Another  was  the  great  effort  made  by Thomas Chalmers  to  provide  200  additional  churches  for  the  people  of  Scotland. He  was  the  very  first  to  suggest  the  immediate  commencement of  a  subscription,  and  the  second  to  put  down  his  own  name  for  a  liberal  sum. Hog  accompanied  Chalmers  on  some of  his  tours  throughout  Scotland. During the first year  £200,000  was subscribed,  and  only  a  few  years  elapsed  before  the  200 churches  were  erected  and  supplied.

About  that  time,  however,  being  constitutionally "conservative"  and  cautious,  and  having  taken  alarm  at  what  appeared  to  him  to  be  rash,  or  prematurely  exacting,  in  the  demands  of  the  Committee,  he  was  one  of  a  small  minority  who  retired,  and  thus  kept  themselves  uncommitted  by  any  of  the  subsequent  negotiations.
from  him  for  the  time  their  confidence,  and  returning  a  more  decided  non-intrusionist  in  his  stead.

At the Disruption
Mr  Hog  was  among  the  very  last  to  be  convinced  that  the  case  of  the  Church  was  hopeless.  He  clung  to  the  persuasion  that  Lord  Aberdeen  meant  bona  fide  to  acknowledge  the  Church's  jurisdiction,  and  that  Sir  George  Sinclair's  clause  might  have  done.  He  could  not  bring  himself  to  believe  that  the  Conservative  Government  was  capable  of  so  destructive  a  deed  as  the  breaking  up  of  the  Establishment.  He  refused  to  admit  that  a  Disruption  was  inevitable,  until  it  had  actually  taken  place.  And  even  then  he  tried  to  persuade  himself  that  it  was  premature,  or  that  the  breach  was  not  irreparable.  It  was  not  till  a  week  or  more  had  elapsed, 
till  the  two  General  Assemblies  had  got  through  the  greater  part  of  their  business,  till  the  Deed  of  Demission  had  been  signed,  and  the  separation  was  complete,  that  he  finally  made  up  his  mind.

But  at  last  he  decided  to  join  the  Free  Church. He  was  slow  in  coming  to  a  decision  ;  but  he  was  firm  in  adherence  to  conscientious  convictions. All  acknowledged  the  sincerity  of  Mr  Hog,  who  never  made  enemies  of  those  from  whom  he  was  constrained  to  differ.  

He  erected,  at  his  own  expense,  a  church  in  his  parish,  and  ably  supported  it.  He  also  largely  contributed  to  the  erection  of  a 
feuars  resided.
home  and  abroad.  By  his  influence  bursaries were  provided  for  deserving  young  men,  and  a  fund  secured  which  will  perpetuate the  benefit.  He  originated  a  scheme  for  the  liquidation  of  all  debt  upon  churches,  manses,  and  schools,  belonging  to  the  Free 
Church  ;  and  had  the  satisfaction  to  learn  before  he  died,  that  the  sum  necessary  to  supplement  congregational  exertion,  viz., 
£50,000,  had  been  all  subscribed.  The  difficult task  of  securing  sites  for  churches  from  reluctant  proprietors,  was  conducted  by  him 
for  several  years,  requiring  delicate  and  extensive correspondence  ;  and  he  was  successful with  all  but  one  or  two.

Other interests
In 1853 he was elected a Fellow of the Royal Society of Edinburgh his proposer being James Thomson Gibson-Craig.

Illness and death
Two  years  before  his  death,  a  very  severe  and  painful  disease  began  to  undermine  his  health.  His  complaint  was  a  creeping  palsy.  During this  period  he  committed  to  paper  many  of  his  thoughts  on  religious  subjects.  His  speech  was  much  affected,  and  he  could  not  enjoy  conversation.  But  writing  gave  him  relief,  though  even  that  was  performed  with  great  difficulty.  On  some  days  he  would 
write  as  many  as  twenty-four  folio  pages,  and  never  a  day  passed  without  his  writing  less  or  more.  Most  of  these  compositions 
Lest  any  circumstances  might  affect  the  maintenance  of  religious  ordinances  in  his  parish,  he  made  provision,  a  short  time  before  his  death,  for  perpetuating  his  personal  contribution  for  the  support  of  the  ministry.   

In  his  last  days  Mr  Hog  was  unable  to  speak  or  write.  But  by  means  of  a  little  tube  or  reed  in  his  mouth,  he  pointed  to  the 
letters  of  a  printed  alphabet  before  him.

On  Sunday, 1 August  1858,  he died, aged 58.  He  was  interred  in  the  burying-ground  attached  to  the  church  of  Kirkliston,  where  he  had  selected  for  himself  a  resting-place  about  two  years  before, in  preference  to  the  ancient  family  vault  close  by,  which  had  heretofore  been  used.

Family

In 1827 he married Helen Maitland Gibson, daughter of Sir Alexander  Charles Maitland, baronet of Clifton Hall. They had one son, Thomas Alexander Hog (1835–1908).

His sister, Rachel Elisabeth Hog, married Patrick Fraser Tytler FRSE.

References

Citations

Sources

1799 births
1858 deaths
People from Midlothian
Alumni of the University of Edinburgh
British landowners
Fellows of the Royal Society of Edinburgh
19th-century British businesspeople
Free Church of Scotland people